Bündnerfleisch, also known as Bindenfleisch, Grisons Meat or Viande des Grisons, is an air-dried meat that is produced in the canton of Graubünden, Switzerland.

Production
The main ingredient is beef, taken from the animal’s upper thigh or shoulder, the fat and the sinews being removed.  Before drying, the meat is treated with white wine and seasonings such as salt, onion and assorted herbs. The initial curing process, lasting 3–5 weeks, takes place in sealed containers stored at a temperature close to freezing point.  The meat is regularly rearranged during this stage, in order to ensure that the salt and seasonings will be evenly distributed and absorbed. During a second drying phase the meat is then hung in free-flowing air at a temperature of between 9 and 14 °C. It is also periodically pressed in order to separate out residual moisture: from this pressing Bündnerfleisch acquires its characteristic rectangular shape. Traditionally Bündnerfleisch was not a smoked meat.

The extent of water loss during the salting and drying processes, whereby the product loses approximately half of its initial weight, is sufficient to confer excellent keeping qualities and a high nutritional value, without the need for any additional preservatives.

Consumption
Bündnerfleisch is sliced very thinly and served with bread. It is often part of the traditional dish raclette, served to accompany the cheese of the same name alongside ham and vegetables. It can also be cut into strips or little cubes and served in soup.

Commercialisation
Most Bündnerfleisch is consumed inside Switzerland, but some is exported within Europe, to Canada and the United States and to Japan.

Variants
Bündnerfleisch appears to be related to the dried meat product from the Besançon region of France known as 'brési'. It is also very similar to bresaola, which is produced in the neighbouring Italian province of Valtellina; unlike Bündnerfleisch, bresaola is not pressed, though.

Media references
On September 25, 2010, Switzerland's finance minister Hans-Rudolf Merz, reading in parliament a nearly incomprehensibly dry text which had been prepared by bureaucrats, started giggling uncontrollably when he reached a mention of Bündnerfleisch.

On the television show Frasier, in episode 7 of season 5 (The Perfect Guy) Niles is delighted to purchase Bündnerfleisch at Robert's Gourmet Goodies. He refers to Bündnerfleisch as "Swiss prosciutto".

See also

Swiss sausages and cured meats
Salsiz, another dried meat product from the canton
Brési, another dried meat product from Switzerland
Bresaola, another Alpine dried meat product
Dried meat
List of dried foods

References
 
 Wissenswertes über Bündnerfleisch, English version Bündnerfleisch - Air-dried beef from the Grisons

Dried meat
Swiss cuisine
Culture of Graubünden